Mount Boyles is, at , the highest peak in the Thomas Mountains, located south of the Sweeney Mountains in Palmer Land. It was discovered and roughly mapped by the Ronne Antarctic Research Expedition, 1947–48, led by Commander Finn Ronne, U.S. Navy Reserve. It was mapped in greater detail by the United States Geological Survey (USGS) from surveys and from U.S. Navy aerial photographs, 1961–67, and named by the Advisory Committee on Antarctic Names following the visit of a USGS geological party, 1977–78, after Joseph M. Boyles, a geologist with the party.

References
 

Mountains of Palmer Land